Lac-Simon may refer to:

 Lac-Simon, Abitibi-Témiscamingue, Quebec, an Indian reserve
 Lac-Simon, Outaouais, Quebec, a municipality